Take the Wheel may refer to:

 "Take The Wheel", a song by Tokyo Rose from the album Reinventing a Lost Art
 "Take the Wheel", a song by Susumu Hirasawa from the album Aurora
 "Take The Wheel", a song by Deric Ruttan from the album Deric Ruttan

See also
 Taking the Wheel, album by David Campbell
 "I'm Taking the Wheel", a song by SHeDAISY
 "Jesus, Take the Wheel", a song by Carrie Underwood
 "Someone Take the Wheel", a song by The Replacements from the album All Shook Down